Sergent is an unincorporated community and coal town in Letcher County, Kentucky, United States.

References

Unincorporated communities in Letcher County, Kentucky
Unincorporated communities in Kentucky
Coal towns in Kentucky